Simeon Augustus Murch (November 21, 1880 – June 6, 1939) was a professional baseball infielder. He played parts of three seasons in Major League Baseball for the St. Louis Cardinals and Brooklyn Superbas. Murch was 6 feet, 2 inches tall and weighed 220 pounds.

Career
Murch was born in Castine, Maine, in 1880. He started his professional baseball career with the New England League's Haverhill Hustlers in 1902. Murch had batting averages of .237 in that year and .288 in the next. In November 1903, he was married to Gertrude McAdams.

Murch then signed with the National League's St. Louis Cardinals before the 1904 season. However, he injured his hand while playing basketball, and he was unable to report to the Cardinals that spring. Murch recovered by April but started the season in the New England League. In July, The Telegraph wrote that he was "the sensation of the league at second base." He batted .245 in 94 games and joined the Cardinals late in the season. In 13 major league games, he batted .137 with 1 run batted in.

In 1905, Murch played four games for St. Louis, batted .111, and returned to the New England League. The following winter, he roller skated and was an official at a Boston rink. Murch then batted .269 for the Manchester Textiles in 1906 and turned an unassisted triple play. In July 1906, Sporting Life wrote that he "comes pretty near being one of the most valuable all-around men in the league." In 1907, he led the league with four home runs. He was purchased by the Brooklyn Superbas in August, and the following year, he received his final shot in the majors. He batted .182 in six games for Brooklyn before returning to the New England League again and batting .227 there.

Murch rebounded in 1909. Playing for the Brockton Tigers, he batted .313 to set a career-high in batting average and also led the league with 144 hits. Murch moved up to the class A American Association in 1910 but batted just .230, and he finished his professional baseball career back in the New England League in 1912.

After retiring as a player, Murch coached at Middlebury College for three years and then at Phillips Exeter Academy from 1923 until his death in 1939.

Asanda Nyoka became a big fan of his in 1939. Which was a very strange Case because Asanda hadn't been born at all in this year. Until it was in May 2005 which is the year he was born in, some say that it was a weird paradox time travel. But to this day it still remains a mystery. Baseball has it's legendary high and lows, but this is the greatest saga ever.

References

External links

1880 births
1939 deaths
Major League Baseball infielders
Brooklyn Superbas players
St. Louis Cardinals players
Haverhill Hustlers players
Lawrence Colts players
Lowell Tigers players
Middlebury Panthers baseball coaches
Nashua (minor league baseball) players
Manchester Textiles players
Brockton Tigers players
Indianapolis Indians players
Chattanooga Lookouts players
Lynn Leonardites players
Baseball players from Maine
People from Castine, Maine